The following is a list of rulers of the Kingdom of Jimma. Jimma was one of the kingdoms in the Gibe region of Ethiopia that emerged in the 19th century.

List of Rulers of the Gibe Kingdom of Jimma

Moti = Rulers
Horse names in parentheses

See also
Monarchies of Ethiopia
Rulers and heads of state of Ethiopia
Ethiopian aristocratic and court titles

Ethiopia history-related lists
Lists of African rulers
 Jimma